Lakshya may refer to:

 Lakshya (2004 film), a 2004 Indian Hindi-language film directed by Farhan Akhtar
 Lakshya (2021 film), a 2021 Indian Telugu-language film
 DRDO Lakshya, an Indian remotely piloted target drone system
 Lakshya, a Marathi-language crime series

See also
Lakshyam (disambiguation)